Elizabeth Whitlock (née Kemble; 2 April 1761, Warrington, Lancashire27 February 1836, Addlestone) was an English actress, a member of the Kemble family of actors.  She made her first appearance on the stage in 1783. In 1785 she married Charles E. Whitlock, went with him to America, and played with much success there. She seems to have retired about 1807. Her sister was actress Sarah Siddons.

References 

 
 
 

1761 births
1836 deaths
18th-century English actresses
19th-century English actresses
English stage actresses
Kemble family
Actresses from Warrington
People from Addlestone